Michael Wadding  is an Irish hurling referee from Waterford.

Wadding was the referee for the 2010 All-Ireland Senior Hurling Championship Final between Tipperary and Kilkenny.		
Wadding was also the referee for the 1997 All-Ireland Minor final and the 2003 All-Ireland Under 21 final.

References

External links
Hurling Stats Profile

Living people
Hurling referees
Year of birth missing (living people)